The Dolores-Guayaquil Megashear is a first-order shear zone and fault zone in Northern South America. The megashear runs from the Gulf of Guayaquil in southwestern Ecuador, through Colombia, to Dolores in Venezuela.

See also
Andean Volcanic Belt

References

Strike-slip faults
Geology of South America